Following is a list of multimedia franchises originating in television series, whether animated or live-action.

In the following tables, the initial media through which the franchise characters or settings became known is shown in boldface. Only works of fiction are considered part of the series; a book or a documentary film about the franchise is not itself an installment in the franchise.

Franchises originating in animated television series

Franchises originating in live action television series

See also
 List of fictional shared universes in film and television – many multimedia franchises are based in fictional universes
 List of public domain works with multimedia adaptations
 List of highest-grossing media franchises
 List of television series made into books
List of television show franchises
 Media mix
 Science fiction on television#Media fandom

References

Lists of multimedia franchises